Brad Lester (born October 24, 1985) is a former gridiron football running back. He played college football at Auburn University.

Early years
Brad Lester was born to Phillis Miller and Calvin Lester. He attended Parkview High School  in Georgia, playing alongside current Major League Baseball outfielder Jeff Francoeur.

College career
Lester missed the 2007 Cotton Bowl as well as the first 5 games of the 2007 season due to concerns over his academic eligibility. Lester was seriously injured in a game against Mississippi State.

Professional career
Lester went undrafted in the 2009 NFL Draft. He worked out for the Houston Texans on August 6, 2009 after an injury to running back Jeremiah Johnson. Lester played the 2010 season with the Edmonton Eskimos of the Canadian Football League (CFL). In 2012, Lester signed with the Georgia Rampage of the Ultimate Indoor Football League (UIFL) for their 2013 season.

References

External links
ESPN Player Stats

1985 births
Living people
People from Lilburn, Georgia
Sportspeople from the Atlanta metropolitan area
African-American players of American football
Players of American football from Georgia (U.S. state)
African-American players of Canadian football
American football running backs
Auburn Tigers football players
Georgia Rampage players
American players of Canadian football
Canadian football running backs
Edmonton Elks players
21st-century African-American sportspeople
20th-century African-American people